Psaltoda insularis, commonly known as the Lord Howe Island cicada, is a species of cicada native to Lord Howe Island. It was described by Howard Ashton in 1914.

References

Hemiptera of Australia
Insects described in 1914
Insects of Lord Howe Island
Psaltodini